Kishorchandra Vankavala (1940 – 29 June 2013) was an Indian politician. He was Gujarat MLA for Surat West (since 2007).

Death
Vankavala died of lung cancer on 29 June 2013 at age 70.

References

Gujarat MLAs 2007–2012
Deaths from lung cancer in India
1940s births
2013 deaths
Bharatiya Janata Party politicians from Gujarat
Indian National Congress politicians